This article is a list of diseases of Douglas-fir (Pseudotsuga menziezii).

Fungal diseases

References 
Common Names of Diseases, The American Phytopathological Society

Douglas-fir
Conifer pathogens and diseases
Pseudotsuga